Garton (or Garton in Holderness) is a village in the East Riding of Yorkshire, England, in an area known as Holderness.
It lies on the B1242 road.

It forms part of the civil parish of East Garton.

History
The church dedicated to St Michael was designated a Grade I listed building in 1966 and is now recorded in the National Heritage List for England, maintained by Historic England.

Blue Hall farm to the west of the village was designated in 1966 as a Grade II* listed building.

In 1823 inhabitants in the village numbered 160. Occupations included ten farmers, a bricklayer, a carpenter and a blacksmith. Two carriers operated between the village and Hull on Tuesdays.

During the Second World War, a German, moored, magnetic influence mine, TMA-1 came ashore at Corton sands at Garton.  Lcdr. Roy Berryman Edwards, RN, DSO, BEM took the assignment to dismantle the mine with U.S. Navy Mine Disposalman John Martin Howard observing the operation.   The mine detonated during the disposal operation with the full four hundred and seventy pounds of charge. The detonation killed Howard and Edwards and scatted debris for two hundred yards in each direction along the beach.

References

External links

Villages in the East Riding of Yorkshire
Holderness